The 26th Moscow International Film Festival was held from 18 to 27 July 2004. The Golden George was awarded to the Russian film Our Own directed by Dmitriy Meshiev.

Jury
 Alan Parker (United Kingdom – Chairman of the Jury)
 Jerzy Stuhr (Poland)
 Boris Akunin (Russia)
 Armen Medvedev (Russia)
 Barbara Sukowa (Germany)
 Humbert Balsan (France)

Films in competition
The following films were selected for the main competition:

Awards
 Golden George: Our Own by Dmitriy Meshiev
 Special Jury Prize: Silver George: Revolution of Pigs by Jaak Kilmi and René Reinumägi
 Silver George:
 Best Director: Dmitriy Meshiev for Our Own
 Best Actor: Bohdan Stupka for Our Own
 Best Actress: China Zorrilla for Conversations with Mother
 Silver George for the Best Film of the Perspective competition: The Hotel Venus by Hideta Takahata
 Lifetime Achievement Award: Emir Kusturica
 Stanislavsky Award: Meryl Streep

References

External links
Moscow International Film Festival: 2004 at Internet Movie Database

2004
2004 film festivals
2004 festivals in Europe
Mos
2004 in Moscow
July 2004 events in Russia